The 2019–20 Buffalo Bulls men's basketball team represents the University at Buffalo during the 2019–20 NCAA Division I men's basketball season. The Bulls, led by first-year head coach Jim Whitesell, play their home games at Alumni Arena in Amherst, New York as members of the East Division of the Mid-American Conference.

Previous season
During the 2018–19 season, The Bulls posted a school-record 32 wins, including an NCAA tournament victory over former head coach Bobby Hurley and Arizona State. Their season, which to that point was punctuated by a 13-game winning streak and MAC conference titles (regular and post-season), ended in a 78–58 loss to Texas Tech in the second round. At season's end, Oats departed to become head coach at Alabama despite signing an extension with Buffalo a week earlier.

2019 recruiting class

Roster

Schedule and Results

|-
!colspan=9 style=|Exhibition

|-
!colspan=9 style=| Non-conference regular season

|-
!colspan=9 style=| MAC regular season

|-
!colspan=9 style=| MAC Tournament

References

Buffalo Bulls basketball
Buffalo